The Fleț is a right tributary of the river Luț in Romania. It discharges into the Luț in Breaza.

References

Rivers of Romania
Rivers of Mureș County